Lieutenant colonel Ralph Howard Broome  (5 July 1889 – 25 January 1985) was a British Army officer and bobsledder who competed during the early 1920s. He was born in Dalhousie, Himachal Pradesh, India, and died in Poole, Dorset, England.

Honours
Broome won a silver medal in the four-man event at the 1924 Winter Olympics in Chamonix.

Earlier, Broome had been awarded the Military Cross (1915) and Distinguished Service Order (1918) while serving with the Wiltshire Regiment in the First World War. He retired from the Royal Tank Corps as a lieutenant colonel in 1935.

References

Sources
Bobsleigh four-man Olympic medallists for 1924, 1932–56, and since 1964
Databaseolympics.com profile
Wallenchinsky, David. (1984). "Bobsled: Four-Man". In The Complete Book the Olympics: 1896–1980. New York: Penguin Books. p. 559.

Bobsledders at the 1924 Winter Olympics
Olympic bobsledders of Great Britain
British male bobsledders
People from Chamba district
1889 births
1985 deaths
Olympic medalists in bobsleigh
Medalists at the 1924 Winter Olympics
Recipients of the Military Cross
Companions of the Distinguished Service Order
British Army personnel of World War I
Olympic silver medallists for Great Britain
Royal Tank Regiment officers
Wiltshire Regiment officers
Military personnel of British India